Risto Talosela (21 November 1924 – 26 October 2018) was a Finnish wrestler. He competed in the men's freestyle lightweight at the 1952 Summer Olympics.

References

External links
 

1924 births
2018 deaths
Finnish male sport wrestlers
Olympic wrestlers of Finland
Wrestlers at the 1952 Summer Olympics
People from Lapua
Sportspeople from South Ostrobothnia